Wolfgang Amadeus Mozart (1756–1791) was a composer during the Classical period.

Mozart may also refer to:

People

Family of Wolfgang Amadeus Mozart 
Mozart family, Wolfgang Amadeus Mozart's family
Franz Mozart (1649–1694), Wolfgang's paternal great-grandfather
Johann Georg Mozart (1679–1736), Wolfgang's paternal grandfather
Leopold Mozart (1719–1787), Wolfgang's father
Anna Maria Mozart née Pertl (1720–1778), Wolfgang's mother
Maria Anna Mozart (1751–1829), Wolfgang's sister ("Nannerl")
Maria Anna Thekla Mozart (1758–1841), Wolfgang's cousin ("Bäsle")
Constanze Mozart (1762–1842), Wolfgang's wife
Karl Thomas Mozart (1784–1858), Wolfgang's and Constanze's elder surviving son
Franz Xaver Wolfgang Mozart (1791–1844), Wolfgang's and Constanze's youngest child, composer and pianist

Others 
Mozart Santos Batista Júnior (born 1979), Brazilian footballer
Mozart Camargo Guarnieri (1907–1993), Brazilian composer
Marc Mozart, German songwriter and record producer, member of Mozart & Friends
Amadeus Mozart, one half of the UK Hard House duo The Tidy Boys

Places
Mozart, Saskatchewan, Canada, a small hamlet
Mozart, West Virginia, United States, an unincorporated community
Mozart (crater), a crater on Mercury

Arts and entertainment

Films
Mozart (1936 film), a British film about the composer
Mozart (1955 film), an Austrian film about the composer

Musicals
Mozart (comédie musicale), 1925 musical comedy by Reynaldo Hahn and Sacha Guitry
Mozart!, Austrian musical about the composer
Mozart, l'opéra rock, 2008 French musical directed by Olivier Dahan

Other arts and entertainment
Mozart, a meerkat in Meerkat Manor
MozART group, a music-comic performance group

Computing and technology
HTC 7 Mozart, a mobile smartphone
Mozart the music processor, a music notation program
Mozart Programming System, a multiplatform implementation of the Oz programming language

Transport
Mozart (train), a train service named after the composer
Mozart (plane), name of the Lauda Air Flight 004 Boeing 767 that crashed in 1991

Other uses
Mozart (horse), a racehorse
MOZART (model), chemical transport model of atmospheric ozone

See also

Mozart effect, a theory that listening to Mozart's music can enhance intellect
Mozartkugeln, a chocolate made to honor Mozart, popular in Austria
Juan Crisóstomo Arriaga (1806–1826), composer called the "Spanish Mozart"
François-Adrien Boieldieu (1775–1834), composer called the "French Mozart"
Joseph Martin Kraus (1756–1792), composer called the "Swedish Mozart"
Jacques Offenbach (1819–1880), composer called the "Mozart of the Champs-Élysées"
A. R. Rahman (born 1966), composer called the "Mozart of Madras"
Gioachino Rossini (1792–1868), composer called the "Italian Mozart"
Chevalier de Saint-Georges (1745–1799), composer from Guadeloupe called the "Black Mozart"
Vicente Martín y Soler (1754–1806), composer called the "Valencian Mozart"
Samuel Wesley (1766–1837), composer called the "English Mozart"

German-language surnames